In business strategy, cost leadership is establishing a competitive advantage by having the lowest cost of operation in the industry.  Cost leadership is often driven by company efficiency, size, scale, scope and cumulative experience (learning curve).
A cost leadership strategy aims to exploit scale of production, well-defined scope and other economies (e.g., a good purchasing approach), producing highly standardized products, using advanced technology.
In recent years, more and more companies have chosen a strategic mix to achieve market leadership. These patterns consist of simultaneous cost leadership, superior customer service and product leadership. Walmart has succeeded across the world due to its cost leadership strategy. The company has cut down on excesses at every point of production and thus are able to provide the consumers with quality products at low prices.   

Cost leadership is different from price leadership. A company could be the lowest cost producer yet not offer the lowest-priced products or services. If so, that company would have a higher than average profitability. However, cost leader companies do compete on price and are very effective at such a form of competition, having a low cost structure and management.

The concept of cost leadership was developed by Michael Porter.

References

Strategic management